Natatolana aotearoa is a species of crustacean in the family Cirolanidae, and was first described by Stephen John Keable in 2006.

It is a benthic species, living at depths of 13 - 520 m in temperate waters.

References

Cymothoida
Crustaceans of New Zealand
Crustaceans described in 2006
Taxa named by Stephen John Keable